The 2002 Mountain Dew Southern 500, the 53rd running of the event, was a NASCAR Winston Cup Series race held on September 1, 2002 at Darlington Raceway in Darlington, South Carolina. Contested at 367 laps on the 1.366 mile (2.198 km) speedway, it was the twenty-fifth race of the 2002 NASCAR Winston Cup Series season. Jeff Gordon of Hendrick Motorsports won the race.

Background
Darlington Raceway, nicknamed by many NASCAR fans and drivers as "The Lady in Black" or "The Track Too Tough to Tame" and advertised as a "NASCAR Tradition", is a race track built for NASCAR racing located near Darlington, South Carolina. It is of a unique, somewhat egg-shaped design, an oval with the ends of very different configurations, a condition which supposedly arose from the proximity of one end of the track to a minnow pond the owner refused to relocate. This situation makes it very challenging for the crews to set up their cars' handling in a way that will be effective at both ends.

The track, Darlington Raceway,  is a four-turn  oval. The track's first two turns are banked at twenty-five degrees, while the final two turns are banked two degrees lower at twenty-three degrees.

Top 10 results

Race statistics
 Time of race: 4:13:35
 Average Speed: 
 Pole Speed: no time trials
 Cautions: 9 for 63 laps
 Margin of Victory: 1.734 sec
 Lead changes: 14
 Percent of race run under caution: 17.2%         
 Average green flag run: 33.8 laps

References

Mountain Dew Southern 500
Mountain Dew Southern 500
Mountain Dew Southern 500
NASCAR races at Darlington Raceway